Shah Purah is a small village north of the city of Bucheki, Nankana Sahib District in the Punjab province of Pakistan.

Populated places in Nankana Sahib District